The 2001 Edinburgh Festival Fringe was the 54th Edinburgh Festival Fringe. The Fringe ran from 5–27 August 2001 and presented 1462 shows over 176 venues.

Awards

Theatre

Scotsman Fringe First Awards

Week One: 
Gagarin Way
Runt
Like Thunder
Bedbound
Ferdydurke

Week Two: 
Man in the Flying Lawn Chair
Moving Objects
Raw
Jesus Hopped the A Train
Neutrino

Week Three: 
School for Fools
Upside Down
Cracked
Mental
Midden

Comedy

Perrier Comedy Awards
Winner:
Garth Marenghi's Netherhead (Richard Ayoade, Matthew Holness and Alice Lowe)

Nominees:
Jason Byrne
Adam Hills - Go You Big Red Fire Engine
Daniel Kitson - Love, Innocence And The Word Cock
Dan Antopolski - Antopolski 2000

Best Newcomer Award
Winner:
Garth Cruickshank and Eddie McCabe - Let's Have a Shambles

Nominees:
Andy Zaltzman versus the Dog of Doom
Danny Bhoy
Cambridge Footlights - Far too Happy (Edward Jaspers, Tim Key, Dan Macaskill, James Morris, Mark Watson and Sophie Winkleman)

References

Edinburgh Festival Fringe, 2001
2000s in Edinburgh
Edinburgh Festival Fringe